The list of ship launches in 1748 includes a chronological list of some ships launched in 1748.


References

1748
Ship launches